The 2022–23 Admiral Bet Basketball League of Serbia is the 17th season of the Basketball League of Serbia, the top-tier professional basketball league in Serbia. Also, it is the 78th national championship played by Serbian clubs inclusive of the nation's previous incarnations as Yugoslavia and Serbia & Montenegro.

Crvena zvezda mts is the 7-time defending champion.

Teams 
A total of 21 teams participate in the 2022–23 Basketball League of Serbia.

Distribution
The following is the access list for this season.

Promotion and relegation 
 Teams promoted from the Second League
 Spartak Office Shoes
 Čačak 94

 Teams relegated to the Second League
 Radnički Kragujevac
 Slodes SoccerBet

Venues and locations

First League

Personnel and sponsorship

Coaching changes

Standings

SuperLeague

Qualified teams

Personnel and sponsorship

Coaching changes

Clubs in European competitions

See also
List of current Basketball League of Serbia team rosters
2022–23 Second Men's League of Serbia (basketball)
2022–23 Radivoj Korać Cup
2022–23 Basketball Cup of Serbia
2022–23 ABA League First Division
2022–23 ABA League Second Division
2022–23 First Women's Basketball League of Serbia
2022–23 KK Crvena zvezda season
2022–23 KK Partizan season

References

External links
 
 Serbian League Playoff at srbijasport.net

Basketball League of Serbia seasons
Serbia
Basketball
Current basketball seasons